Wilhelm 'Willi' Hahnemann (14 April 1914 – 23 August 1991) was an Austrian and German football player who started his career at Admira Vienna.

Club career
In the 1935-36 Austrian league season he netted 23 goals for his club to become the league's top scorer. On 13 September 1943 Hahnemann played in a friendly for Slavia Prague. Hahnemann scored 9 and Josef Bican scored 8 in a 20-1 victory against SK Uhonice.

International career
Hahnemann played 23 games from 1935 to 1948 for the Austria national football team and scored four goals in these appearances.  

After the Anschluss that united Austria and Germany, Hahnemann played 23 matches for Germany's national team between 1938 and 1941, scoring 16 goals.  He also appeared with the German squad that took part in the 1938 World Cup in France.

In a 1940 international match he managed the feat of a double hat-trick in a 13:0 victory over Finland. The only player to score more goals for Germany in a single match was Gottfried Fuchs who scored 10 times against Russia at the 1912 Olympic games in Stockholm. He also played for Austria at the 1948 Summer Olympics.

After his playing career, he became a manager with SpVgg Greuther Fürth and in Switzerland.

Honours
Austrian Football Championship (6):
 1932, 1934, 1936, 1937, 1939, 1947
Austrian Cup (3):
 1932, 1934, 1947
Austrian Bundesliga Top Goalscorer (1):
 1936

References

External links
 
 Goldene Tage am Goldenen Horn – Der Spiegel
 

1914 births
1991 deaths
Footballers from Vienna
Austrian footballers
Austria international footballers
German footballers
Germany international footballers
Dual internationalists (football)
FC Admira Wacker Mödling players
1938 FIFA World Cup players
Olympic footballers of Austria
Footballers at the 1948 Summer Olympics
Austrian football managers
First Vienna FC managers
SpVgg Greuther Fürth managers
Grasshopper Club Zürich managers
FC Lausanne-Sport managers
FC Wacker Innsbruck managers
FC Biel-Bienne managers
Association football forwards